Porush in Iran may refer to:
 Porush-e Bala
 Porush-e Pain